Adoration of the Christ Child is a 1463 tempera on panel painting by Filippo Lippi, in the Uffizi since 1919. It was last restored in 2007 by Daniele Rossi. It was first attributed to Lippi by Pudelko - he argued it was early in the artist's career due to its references to Beato Angelico's style, but Bernard Berenson later argued that these references instead placed it in a more mature phase. 

It is also known as the Camaldoli Adoration of the Christ Child, named after the Camaldoli Monastery - according to the Lives of the Artists, it was commissioned by Lucrezia Tornabuoni for a cell there which had been rebuilt by her husband Piero il Gottoso in 1463. On the right are John the Baptist and Romuald, the latter being the founder of the Camaldoli Hermitage.

References

Paintings by Filippo Lippi
Paintings in the collection of the Uffizi
Nativity of Jesus in art
Paintings depicting John the Baptist
1460s paintings
Paintings of Saint Romuald